Bomb Patrol Afghanistan is an American documentary television series that premiered in the United States on G4 in October 2011. The series follows members of a United States Navy EOD (Explosive Ordnance Disposal) unit (Platoon 3-4-2) as they hunt for and dismantle explosives in Afghanistan. Bomb Patrol Afghanistan began the second half of its first season on March 27, 2012 consisting of deleted scenes, behind the scenes and best of specials. Josh Duhamel hosted a special "sit down" episode with four members of the original cast in the G4 studios. Duhamel refused to sit down during the special, and decided to stand for the whole taping out of respect for the lives lost during the 17 episode run.

The team 

The team consists of:
 Lieutenant Junior Grade (LTJG) Brad Penley
 Chief Petty Officer John Groat
 Petty Officer 1st Class Ricky Thibeault
 Petty Officer 1st Class Jeremy Stein
 Petty Officer 2nd Class Brendan Schmutte
 Petty Officer 3rd Class Matt Rayl
 Petty Officer 3rd Class Chase Holzhauer
 Petty Officer 3rd Class Sam Durham

Episodes

International broadcast 
 United Kingdom – From March 11, 2013 on Channel 5. The title has been changed to just Bomb Patrol and the first episode name has been renamed to The Rules of Engagement and the second Road of Blood.
 Czech Republic – From April 30, 2013 on Prima Cool under name Pyrotechnická hlídka: Afghánistán (Pyrotechnic Patrol: Afghanistan)

References 

General references

External links 
 

G4 (American TV network) original programming
Documentary films about the War in Afghanistan (2001–2021)
2010s American documentary television series
2011 American television series debuts
2012 American television series endings
Fiction about bomb disposal
Television series about the United States Navy